Saint Philip of Agira (also Argirò, Aggira, Agirone, Agirya or Argira) was an early Christian confessor. There are two parallel stories of this saint which give to possible dates in which this saint lived. Traditionally, through the writings of St. Athanasius, it is maintained that Philip of Agira is a saint of the 1st century, born in the year 40 in Cappadocia (modern Turkey) and died on 12 May 103.

Another recent study says to have been born of a Syrian father in Thrace on an unknown date in the 5th century whose elder brothers drowned whilst fishing. Philip was known as the "Apostle of the Sicilians", as he was the first Christian missionary to visit that island. Nothing else can be certainly stated about him.

His feast day is 12 May, and he is naturally, patron saint of the city of Agira, Sicily, and of the city of Ħaż-Żebbuġ, Malta, he is celebrated also in the town of Limina, Sicily, where he also lived. Putatively, his relics were discovered in the church dedicated to him in Agira. Philip is one of the patron saints of the United States Army Special Forces and also known for his power of accomplish exorcisms.

References

Sources
 Il portale di Agira
 History, life, miracles of St. Philip of Agira

Saints from Roman Anatolia
Sicilian saints
Saints from Roman Syria
2nd-century Christian saints